Overlake Village station is a future light rail station in Redmond, Washington, United States. It will be an at-grade station on the East Link Extension, part of Sound Transit's Link light rail system. The station will serve the Overlake neighborhood and its existing park and ride. Construction began on the station in 2017 and it is expected to open in 2024.

Location 
Overlake Village station will be located adjacent to State Route 520 with its entrance on 152nd Avenue NE. A  pedestrian bridge that is planned to connect the station to the west side of the freeway was installed in 2020 and is expected to open in 2023.

History 
Demolition of existing buildings at the site began in May 2017. The adjacent part of 152nd Avenue NE was closed from November 28 to December 19 while utilities under the street were relocated.

References

External links 
Overlake Village Station

Future Link light rail stations
Link light rail stations in King County, Washington
Buildings and structures in Redmond, Washington
Railway stations scheduled to open in 2024